The Hindu College (formerly the Swami Purnananda Secondary School) is a Hindu secondary school in Cove and John in the Demerara-Mahaica region (Region 4) of Guyana.

History

The Hindu College was founded in 1957 by Swami Purnananda - the Hindu leader who founded the Guyana Sevashran Sangha movement in the mid-twentieth century.  In 2010, the college recorded a 100% pass-rate for students taking the Caribbean Secondary Education Certificate (CSEC).  In 2010, the Hindu College received a $300,000 donation to fund the establishment of a learning resource centre that was named the Zara Learning Centre.

References 

Educational institutions established in 1957
High schools and secondary schools in Guyana
1957 establishments in British Guiana
Demerara-Mahaica